The 2014–15 Croatian Second Football League (also known as Druga HNL or 2. HNL) is the 24th season of Croatia's second level football competition since its establishment in 1992.

NK Zagreb were league champions and earned a place in Croatia's first division, Croatian First Football League. Pomorac withdrew from the competition due to financial instability.

Format
The league is contested by 12 teams. Only two teams from Croatian Third Football League were granted license for competing in the second level - Bistra and Imotski.

Hrvatski Dragovoljac were relegated from 2013–14 Croatian First Football League.

Changes from last season
The following clubs have been promoted or relegated at the end of the 2013–14 season:

From 2. HNL
Promoted to 1. HNL
 Zagreb

Relegated to 3. HNL
 Solin (11th place)
 Zelina (12th place)

To 2. HNL
Relegated from 1. HNL
 Hrvatski Dragovoljac (12th place)

Promoted from 3. HNL
 Bistra (3. HNL Center)
 Imotski (3. HNL South)

Clubs

Managerial changes

League table

Results

Matches 1–22

Matches 23–33

Top goalscorers
The top scorers in the 2014–15 Croatian Second Football League season were:

See also
2014–15 Croatian First Football League
2014–15 Croatian Football Cup

Notes

References

External links
Official website  

First Football League (Croatia) seasons
2
Cro